Henry Rollmann (February 9, 1853 – August 23, 1927) was a Wisconsin pharmacist and businessman who served as a member of the Wisconsin State Assembly and the Wisconsin State Senate.

Biography
Rollmann was born on February 9, 1853, in Calvary, Wisconsin. He attended high school in Fond du Lac, Wisconsin. He died at his home in Chilton on August 23, 1927.

Career
Rollmann was a member of the Senate representing the 15th district from 1915 to 1918. Previously, he had been elected to the Assembly in 1906 and 1908. Additionally, Rollmann was an alderman and Mayor of Chilton, Wisconsin. He was a Democrat.

References

External links

Politicians from Fond du Lac, Wisconsin
People from Chilton, Wisconsin
Democratic Party Wisconsin state senators
Democratic Party members of the Wisconsin State Assembly
Mayors of places in Wisconsin
Wisconsin city council members
1853 births
1927 deaths
People from Marshfield, Fond du Lac County, Wisconsin
American bankers
American pharmacists